This is a list of popular games and applications available or in development for iOS–the operating system of the iPhone, iPod touch, and iPad. 

There are  games currently on this list.

Games and applications

See also
 App Store (iOS/iPadOS)
 List of free and open-source iOS applications

References

 
Video game lists by platform
Lists of mobile apps